Modriča is a town and municipality located in Republika Srpska, an entity of Bosnia and Herzegovina. As of 2013 census, the town has a population of 10,137 inhabitants, while the municipality has a population of 25,720 inhabitants.

History

The first written document about Modriča is 13th century charter of Hungarian King Bela IV in which Modriča is mentioned as spring: "...fons Modricha, ubi cadit in Boznam", but it all indicates that it was minor stream which was flowing into Bosna river. According to traditional stories, Modriča was named after the small river with blue, mountain water. It is assumed that the small river is Dusa. According to other narratives, area bears the name of the old Slavic marks of the blue sky and distances, which are more discerned on the horizon than visible – modrina (the blue)/modriča.

There is archaeological evidence of human presence in the territory of present-day Modrica municipality back in the Paleolithic - Old Stone Age. This is evidenced by traces discovered at the site Gradina in the village of Dugo Polje above the valley of Bosna river.
Traces of ancient Neolithic farmers were found in several places, among others at locations Kulište in Kruskovo Polje, at Zdralovo brdo in village Kladari, at location Prljaca, then in villages Vranjak, Kuznjaca, Skugric, Dugo Polje, etc. At Dobor hill is important site with seven archaeological layers of the Iron Age. Traces of old Slavic settlements can be found in several places in Modrica municipality. In the charter of Kotromanic from 1323 mentioned is parish Nenaviste with settlements Modrica and Jakes.

The events were developing around Dobor fortress which presage the end of the Bosnian national independence. Those were conflicts with Hungarians in 1393/94 and 1408th, and the cut of 170 Bosnian boyars on the ramparts of the fort. These areas then became cruel war frontier in a fit of the Turks, and they won Dobor and Modrica in the 1536th. After the defeat of the Turks at Vienna 1683rd, in the next two centuries this was the border area, and that means - the zone of conflicts, rebellions, devastation and economic stagnation. During Austrian-Hungarian rule, in 1897 Modrica has been included in list of such towns that Bosnia and Herzegovina had only 66.

In the second half of the 19th century economic and cultural - educational conditions are slowly improving. Memory was recorded that school existed, maybe even at the end of the 18th century, and in any case from the second half of the 19th century. Modrica was a nursery of schools in the rural area. From 1929 to 1939, Modriča was part of the Vrbas Banovina and from 1939 to 1941 of the Banovina of Croatia within the Kingdom of Yugoslavia.

The conditions improved in the second half of 20th century. because in 1947 railroad Šamac-Sarajevo passed through city, with a branch line Modrića-Gradačac built in 1951. Then some factories in the city were built: oil refinery, factories  of paper and plastic boxes Pamo and Plastmo, flour mill, shoe factory "Vjekoslav Bakulić", color dissolver factory "Hemija" and small wood factory "8th September", together with a required town infrastructure (residential buildings, secondary school, sport hall),. The wheat and cattle  farm "Dr. Mujbegović" (later Petar Mrkonjič) was also expanded. Volleyball team "Modriča" won the national championship of Yugoslavia in 1979.

After the 1992–95 Bosnian War, prewar municipal borders were changed, villages of Jakeš, Pećnik and Modrički Lug were excluded from Modriča and included in the new Vukosavlje municipality, and a few villages from the western part of prewar Gradačac municipality were included, thus the size of the municipality changed substantially.

Demographics

Population

Ethnic composition

Economy

The Modriča oil refinery, currently owned by Russian investors, is located in Modriča.

The following table gives a preview of total number of registered employed people per their core activity (as of 2016):

Religion

There are 18 churches and monasteries of the Serbian Orthodox church, five mosques and three Catholic churches in the municipality.

Sports

FK Modriča plays in the First League of the Republika Srpska
The local volleyball club is Modriča Optima.

Twin towns – sister cities
Modriča is twinned with:

Notable people
 Avdo Karabegović - Hasanbegov (1878–1909), poet
 Kristian Kreković (1901–1985), painter
 Nada Topčagić (b. 1953), singer
 Nikola Nikić (b. 1956), footballer
 Milan Jelić (1956–2007), former President of Republika Srpska
 Marta Savić (b. 1966), singer
 Jusuf Dajić (b. 1984), footballer
 Zdravko Kuzmanović (b. 1987), footballer
 Aleksandar Okolić (b. 1993), volleyball player
 Asim Sarvan (b. 1949), musician, S Vremena Na Vreme

See also
Municipalities of Bosnia and Herzegovina

References

External links

 

 
Populated places in Modriča
Municipalities of Republika Srpska
Cities and towns in Republika Srpska